Abdurahman Dagriri (born May 3, 1990) is a Saudi Arabian professional footballer who plays for Al-Shoulla as a goalkeeper .

Club career
Dagriri started out his career going through the youth ranks of Al-Ittihad and being promoted to the first team. He eventually left Al-Ittihad without making a single appearance, instead, he was loaned out to Hetten for 2 years. He joined Hajer and spent a year making just 3 appearances. During the summer of 2015, Dagriri joined Damac and spent a year before signing for Al-Fayha during the summer of 2016 where he currently is playing. He helped Al-Fayha win the 2017 First Division title and promotion to the Pro League.

Honours
Al-Fayha
 Saudi First Division: 2016–17

References

1990 births
Living people
Saudi Arabian footballers
Ittihad FC players
Hetten FC players
Hajer FC players
Damac FC players
Al-Fayha FC players
Al-Hazem F.C. players
Al-Shoulla FC players
Place of birth missing (living people)
Saudi First Division League players
Saudi Professional League players
Association football goalkeepers